Stratton Mountain can refer to

 Stratton Mountain (Massachusetts)
 Stratton Mountain (Vermont), a 3,940-ft mountain in Stratton, Vermont
 Stratton Mountain Resort, a ski resort on Stratton Mountain, Vermont